Fowey Lifeboat Station is the base for Royal National Lifeboat Institution (RNLI) search and rescue operations at Fowey on the south coast of Cornwall in the United Kingdom. The first lifeboat was stationed in the area in 1859 and the present station was opened in 1997. It operates a Trent Class all weather boat (AWB) and a D class (IB1) inshore lifeboat (ILB).

History
Fowey stands at the mouth of the River Fowey where it forms a natural deep water harbour. The town has a long history of fishing and merchant shipping, although the present quays busy with ships loading china clay were only developed in the 1860s. To the west lies St Austell Bay which includes Par Docks built in the 1840s to handle the mineral traffic from Joseph Treffry's mines and quarries, and Charlestown which had been established about fifty years earlier by Charles Rashleigh. A fatal ship wreck on the Gribben Head between Fowey and St Austell Bay on 6 May 1856 prompted William Rashleigh, a local landowner, to offer the RNLI £50 towards a lifeboat for Fowey and land and building stone for a boathouse.

Polkerris

The position of the mouth of the River Fowey meant that it would be nearly impossible to launch a "pulling and sailing" lifeboat (that is, one powered by oars and sails) during the more dangerous storms when the wind blew from the south, and so it was decided to station the lifeboat at Polkerris, a small fishing village with a  breakwater on the east side of St Austell Bay. A boathouse was built at the top of the beach for £138 4s (£138.20) on land donated by Rashleigh. The lifeboat was delivered free of charge to Lostwithiel railway station in November 1859 by the Cornwall Railway, and then rowed down the river through Fowey and around St Austell Bay to show it to the public. It was named Catherine Rashleigh after William's wife, who was another of the major donors towards its cost.

The first, six-oared, lifeboat was replaced in 1866 by a larger ten-oared boat, the Rochdale and Catherine Rashleigh, which meant that the boathouse had to be altered. So far the official name had been "Fowey Lifeboat Station" but in 1892 it became "Polkerris". In 1895 it changed again to the compromise of "Polkerris and Fowey", but in 1904 it reverted to "Polkerris". During a launch in 1908 a chain broke, and an inspection of the station found that the gradient changed three times in the boathouse and slipway; this was altered by February 1909 to make launching safer. Several requests were made around this time for a lifeboat be stationed at Fowey, but the RNLI decided that the one at Polkerris was operating efficiently. Conditions changed following World War I as the RNLI brought in plans for a more efficient service with motor lifeboats, when it was decided that Fowey would be a better location for such a boat. Polkerris Lifeboat Station closed in 1922, after which it was converted into a café.

Fowey
Despite the promise of a motor lifeboat, the first boat stationed at Fowey was a 12-oared pulling and sailing boat. It was kept moored afloat in the river near Town Quay where the crew had use of a building on the waterfront. In August 1928 the boat was declared unfit for service and so a 45 ft 6in  motor lifeboat that was intended for Thurso Lifeboat Station, the H.C.J. (ON 708), was stationed at Fowey for a few months until Fowey's own boat, the C.D.E.C. (ON 712), arrived and went on station on 6 December. C.D.E.C. served at Fowey until November 1954, launching on service 65 times and saving 49 lives. On 24 November 1954 Fowey's brand new 46 ft 9in  Deneys Reitz (ON 919) went on station and spent her entire career at Fowey until withdrawal in May 1980. She had launched on service 155 times, saving 36 lives.

Deneys Reitz replacement was a much older Relief fleet 46 ft , the 1946 built Gertrude (ON 847) which was at Fowey for eighteen months until November 1981. Another Relief fleet 46 ft 9in Watson, Charles Henry Ashley (ON 866) then filled the breach, but on 16 October 1982 a new type of craft took up station, the first of its class to be put into service. The Leonore Chilcott (ON 1083) was a Brede class lifeboat. She served for five years before being replaced by the older but larger ex-  Thomas Forehead & Mary Rowse II (ON 1028). The Waveney served for more than 8 years, launching on service 169 times and saving 35 lives before being replaced by the current  in October 1996.

The RNLI started to provide small, fast inshore rescue boats in the 1960s, but it was not until August 1996 that one was stationed at Fowey. The harbour at Mevagissey had been considered as a possible ILB station but no suitable site could be found. The small D Class inflatable was initially kept in a wooden container at Berrill's Yard and launched using a davit near the AWB's moorings which had recently been moved from Town Quay. On 4 October 1997 a unique triple ceremony took place at Fowey to bring into service not just a new purpose-built lifeboat station Berrill's Yard at but also to christen the station's two newest lifeboats, Trent Class AWB Maurice and Joyce Hardy (ON 1222) and D Class IRB Olive Herbert.

Service awards
The volunteer crews of the RNLI do not expect reward or recognition for their work, but the records include many rescues that have been recognised by letters, certificates and medals from the RNLI management. The following are just some of the most notable at Fowey.

Two large sailing ships ran aground in a strong gale near Par harbour on 25 November 1865. The Catherine Rashleigh put to sea from Polkerris under the command of Joshua Heath, but lost four oars before she reached the ships. The crew of one then launched their own small boat, but this broke away with just one man and the ship's cat on board. The lifeboat managed to reach them and took them to Par where they took on some replacement oars and returned to the grounded ships. After landing 13 men from the larger vessel at Par, and taking on two fresh rowers, returned to rescue the remaining nine people. The whole rescue took five hours and resulted in Joshua Heath being awarded a silver medal by the RNLI.

Before dawn on 23 March 1947 distress signals were reported near Par Sands. Relief Lifeboat The Brothers set out from Fowey at 04:40. After an hour's search through rain-swept heavy seas a sunken ship was found near Killyvarder Rock, with the crew gathered on a small part that was still out of the water. The tide was rising and so the lifeboat swiftly moved in but had to haul the men on a rope through the sea. Lifeboat Coxswain John Watters was awarded a bronze medal and the efforts of his crew were also recognised.

Description
The three-storey lifeboat station was built in 1997 in a style that blends with the older buildings around it. The gabled central section has covered facilities for the IRB at ground floor level and a small bow window at first floor level. On the left is a two-storey wing which includes a fund-raising RNLI shop. The right hand wing is three storeys high. It is on the landward side of Passage Street opposite the IRB's launch site and the AWB's moorings.

Area of operation
Adjacent lifeboats are an ILB at Looe Lifeboat Station and an AWB at Plymouth Lifeboat Station to the East, and both and AWB and ILB at Falmouth Lifeboat Station to the West.

Lifeboats
'ON' is the RNLI's sequential Official Number; 'Op. No.' is the operational number painted onto the boat.

Pulling and sailing lifeboats

Motor lifeboats

Inshore lifeboats

See also
 List of RNLI stations

References

Sources

External links
 Fowey Lifeboat Station
 RNLI station information

Lifeboat stations in Cornwall
Fowey